Potamarius is a genus of sea catfishes. The three species in this genus exclusively inhabit fresh water in southern Mexico and Guatemala. The individual species have relatively small ranges. The highly endangered Paragenidens grandoculis of Brazil was long classified in Potamarius, but a 2019 study has found it to belong in its own genus.

Species
There are currently three described species in this genus:

 Potamarius izabalensis C. L. Hubbs & R. R. Miller, 1960
 Potamarius nelsoni (Evermann & Goldsborough, 1902) (Lacandon sea-catfish)
 Potamarius usumacintae Betancur-R. & Willink, 2007 (Usumacinta sea-catfish)

References

Ariidae
Catfish genera
Taxa named by Carl Leavitt Hubbs
Taxa named by Robert Rush Miller